= Sangra =

Hindu community in Jammu

The Sangra are Brahmins, found mostly in the Jammu region mainly in Kootah village of Jammu and Kashmir, India. Sangras are Hindu Brahmins in Jammu Region of Jammu and Kashmir, India. Settled in Kootah village, District Kathua and Jammu. It is widely believed that the Sangras of village Kootah have migrated from village Sanghar near Purmandal. Settled in Kootah, Sangras are also known as Shah Sangras because of their Rich and opulent history. The tales of their riches go to the extent that it was told that all the Kings of Jammu and Kashmir used to take loans from Sangra shahs of Kootah to run the state. They owned agricultural lands spreading to several hundred of square miles and also were traders of gold.

Many people of "Sangra" Brahmin tribe follow Sikhism in Punjab and rest of them are Hindu
